Malcolm A. S. Moore, D.Phil. (born January 18, 1944) is the Enid A. Haupt Chair of Cell Biology at the Memorial Sloan-Kettering Cancer Center.  Moore is an oncologist and hematologist known for being the principal investigator in the development of filgrastim. He is a member of various national and international societies and is on the editorial boards of a number of journals. He has served or chaired committees of governmental and professional organizations.

References

External links 
 Moore’s page  at Memorial Sloan-Kettering Cancer Center
 G-CSF: its relationship to leukemia differentiation-inducing activity and other hemopoietic regulators

British oncologists
1944 births
Living people